Waiver or Waivers may refer to:
 Waiver, a voluntary relinquishment or surrender of some known right or privilege

 Waivers (sports), a type of player transaction common to the four North American major league sports:
 Waivers (American football)
 Waivers (NHL)
 Waivers (MLB)
 Waivers (NBA)

 Other uses
 Executive waiver, an administrative tool of the Executive Branch in the U.S.
 Forfeiture and waiver, concepts used by the United States court system
 Whitewash waiver, proposed resolution regarding stockholder rights
 Liability waiver, such as pre-accident releases
 Damage waiver, optional collision coverage when renting a vehicle

See also
 List of types of waivers